The national flag of Lebanon is formed of two horizontal red stripes enveloping a horizontal white stripe. The white stripe is twice the height (width) of the red ones (ratio 1:2:1)—a Spanish fess. The green cedar (Lebanon cedar) in the middle touches each of the red stripes and its width is one third of the width of the flag.

Symbolism 

The presence and position of the Cedar in the middle of the flag is directly inspired by the Lebanese cedar (Cedrus libani). The Cedar is the symbol of Lebanon.  The Cedar of Lebanon has its origin in many biblical references.

The cedar of Lebanon is mentioned seventy-seven times in the Bible, notably in the book Psalms, chapter 92, verse 13, where it says that "The righteous shall flourish like the palm tree, He shall grow like a cedar in Lebanon" and Chapter 104, verse 16, where it is stated: "[t]he trees of the Lord are well watered, the cedars of Lebanon that he planted".

Alphonse de Lamartine (1790–1869), marveling at the cedars of Lebanon during his trip to the Middle East with his daughter Julia, had these words: "[t]he cedars of Lebanon are the relics of centuries and nature, the most famous natural landmarks in the universe. They know the history of the earth, better than the story itself".

Antoine de Saint-Exupéry (1900–1944), who loved the cedars and also had visited Lebanon in 1935, wrote in his work Citadel "[t]he peace is a long growing tree. We need, as the cedar, to rock its unity".

In 1920, in a text of the proclamation of the State of Greater Lebanon, it was said: "[a]n evergreen cedar is like a young nation despite a cruel past. Although oppressed, never conquered, the cedar is its rallying. By the union, it will break all attacks".

The white color on the flag represents the snow as a symbol of purity and peace. The two red stripes refer to the Lebanese blood shed to preserve the country against the successive invaders.

Construction sheet 

According to the Article 5 of the constitution of Lebanon: "The Lebanese flag shall be composed of three horizontal stripes, a white stripe between two red ones. The width of the white stripe shall be equal to that of both red stripes. In the center of and occupying one-third of the white stripe is a green cedar tree with its top touching the upper red strip and its base touching the lower red stripe".

Colors scheme

History

Ancient flags of Lebanon

Flags of clans during the Middle Ages

Flags of sultanates and emirates 

Throughout part of its history, Lebanon, or at least its region, had taken the flag of the people who occupied it (Mamluk, Ottoman Empire)

French Mandate of Lebanon 

During the French Mandate of Lebanon, the Lebanese flag was designed by the president of the Lebanese Renaissance Movement, the late Naoum Mokarzel. It was similar to the tricolour flag of France but with a green cedar (Lebanon Cedar) in the middle.

Lebanese Republic 
The present Lebanese flag was adopted just prior to independence from France in 1943. Seeking independence, the actual flag was first drawn by member of parliament Henri Pharaon in the Chamber of deputies Saeb Salam's house in Mousaitbeh by the deputies of the Lebanese parliament. It was adopted on 7 December 1943, during a meeting in the parliament, where the article 5 in the Lebanese constitution was modified.

One theory is that Henri Pharaon based the composition of the flag on the Lebanese geography and therefore, the first red represents the Mount Lebanon and the second red represents the Anti-Lebanon Mountains and the white represents the Beqaa Valley, which is situated in the middle of the two mountain ranges on the map of Lebanon. And the green cedar (Lebanon Cedar) in the middle of the white part touches each of the red stripes is added because Lebanon is sometimes metonymically referred to as the Land of the Cedars. The composition of the white stripe (a Spanish fess) could have been inspired by the red-yellow-red Flag of Spain, where the flag structure is based on the Lebanese connection to the Mediterranean Sea and its Phoenician past that reached to the Mediterranean shores of present-day Spain.

However, the most likely inspiration for the modern flag is the flag of the precursor to the modern republic, The Mount Lebanon Emirate. The Emirate bore the flag of the Ma'an dynasty, a Druze dynasty which included one of the most influential figures in the shaping of an independent Lebanese identity, Emir Fakhr al-Din II, who struggled through his reign to establish independence from the Ottoman Empire. The flag has the exact same color scheme and even a similar composition. Red, white, and green being the primary colors with the green wreath in the center being replaced by the cedar in the modern flag; it is entirely probable that the modern flag is simply a redesign of this older, dynastic flag. Further evidence is supported by the fact that many government institutions in Lebanon continue to use the Ma'anid flag, such as the flag of the Lebanese Armed Forces, but without the green wreath, and it is still in place to this day.

Variant flags of Lebanon 
The following is a list of variant flags used in Lebanon

Official Lebanese flags from 1918–present

Flags of municipalities in Lebanon

Other flags

See also 

 Coat of arms of Lebanon
 Insignia of the Republican Guard (Lebanon)
 Maronite flag

Notes

External links 

Lebanese Flag Accurate, high quality, & high resolution flags of Lebanon.

Lebanon
National symbols of Lebanon
Lebanon
Lebanon